Reimund was a long serving Archdeacon of Leicester; he was first mentioned in 1198 and lastly in 1225.

Notes

See also
 Diocese of Lincoln
 Diocese of Peterborough
 Diocese of Leicester
 Archdeacon of Leicester

Archdeacons of Leicester
12th-century English clergy
13th-century English clergy